John Robison FRSE (4 February 1739 – 30 January 1805) was a British physicist and mathematician. He was a professor of natural philosophy (the precursor of natural science) at the University of Edinburgh.

A member of the Edinburgh Philosophical Society when it received its royal warrant, he was appointed as the first general secretary to the Royal Society of Edinburgh (1783–98). Robison invented the siren and also worked with James Watt on an early steam car. Following the French Revolution, Robison became disenchanted with elements of the Enlightenment. He authored Proofs of a Conspiracy in 1797—a polemic accusing Freemasonry of being infiltrated by Weishaupt's Order of the Illuminati. His son was the inventor Sir John Robison (1778–1843).

Biography 

The son of John Robison, a Glasgow merchant, he was born in Boghall, Baldernock, Stirlingshire (now East Dunbartonshire) and attended Glasgow Grammar School and the University of Glasgow (MA 1756). After a brief stay in London in 1758 Robison became the tutor to the midshipman son of Admiral Knowles, sailing with the Royal Navy on General Wolfe's expedition to Quebec and Portugal (1756–62). His mathematical skills were employed in navigation and surveying. Returning to Britain in 1762, he joined the Board of Longitude — a team of scientists who tested John Harrison's marine chronometer on a voyage to Jamaica.

Subsequently, he settled in Glasgow engaging in the practical science of James Watt and Joseph Black in opposition to the systematic continental European chemistry of Antoine Lavoisier and its adherents such as Joseph Priestley. In 1766 he succeeded Black as Professor of Chemistry at the University of Glasgow. He in turn was succeeded in 1770 by Black's assistant, William Irvine.

In 1769, he announced that balls with like electrical charges repel each other with a force that varies as the inverse-square of the distance between them, anticipating Coulomb's law of 1785.

In 1770 he travelled to Saint Petersburg as the secretary of Admiral Charles Knowles, where he taught mathematics to the cadets at the Naval Academy at Kronstadt, obtaining a double salary and the rank of lieutenant colonel. Robison moved to Scotland in 1773 and took up the post of Professor of natural philosophy at the University of Edinburgh. He lectured on mechanics, hydrostatics, astronomy, optics, electricity and magnetism. His conception of mechanical philosophy’ became influential in nineteenth-century British physics. His name appears in the 1776 "Minute Book of The Poker Club", a crucible of the Scottish Enlightenment. In 1783 he became General Secretary of the Royal Society of Edinburgh and in 1797 his articles for the Encyclopædia Britannica gave a good account of the scientific, mathematical and technological knowledge of the day. He also prepared for publication, in 1799, the chemical lectures of his friend and mentor, Joseph Black.

Robison worked with James Watt on an early steam car. This project came to nothing and has no direct connection to Watt's later improvement of the Newcomen steam engine. He along with Joseph Black and others gave evidence about Watt's originality and their own lack of connection to his key idea of the Separate Condenser.

Robison did however invent the siren, though it was Charles Cagniard de la Tour who named it after producing an improved model.

Proofs of a Conspiracy  
Towards the end of his life he published Proofs of a Conspiracy in 1797, alleging clandestine intrigue by the Illuminati and Freemasons (the work's full title was Proofs of a Conspiracy against all the Religions and Governments of Europe, carried on in the secret meetings of Freemasons, Illuminati and Reading Societies). The secret agent monk, Alexander Horn provided much of the material for Robison's allegations. French priest Abbé Barruel independently developed similar views that the Illuminati had infiltrated Continental Freemasonry, leading to the excesses of the French Revolution. In 1798, the Reverend G. W. Snyder sent Robison's book to George Washington for his thoughts on the subject in which he replied to him in a letter:

Modern conspiracy theorists, such as Nesta Webster and William Guy Carr, believe the methods of the Illuminati as described in Proofs of a Conspiracy were copied by radical groups throughout the 19th and 20th centuries in their subversion of benign organizations. Spiritual Counterfeits Project editor Tal Brooke has compared the views of Proofs of a Conspiracy with those found in Carroll Quigley's Tragedy and Hope (Macmillan, 1966). Brooke suggests that the New World Order, which Robison believed Adam Weishaupt (founder of the Illuminati) had in part accomplished through the infiltration of Freemasonry, will now be completed by those holding sway over the international banking system (e.g., by means of the Rothschilds' banks, the U.S. Federal Reserve, the International Monetary Fund, and the World Bank).

Works 
 Outlines of Mechanical philosophy: Containing the Heads of a Course of Lectures, Edinburgh, William Creech, 1781.
 Outlines of a Course of Experimental Philosophy, Edinburgh, William Creech, 1784.
 Outlines of a Course of Lectures on Mechanical Philosophy, Edinburgh, J. Brown, 1803.
 Elements of Mechanical Philosophy: Being the Substance of a Course of Lectures on that Science, Edinburgh, Archibald Constable, 1804.
 Robison contributed well over forty articles to the third edition of the Encyclopædia Britannica (1797) and its supplement, including: Resistance of Fluids, Roof, Running of Rivers, Seamanship, Telescope and Water-works.
 A System of Mechanical Philosophy, Vol. 2, Vol. 3, Vol. 4, Edinburgh, J. Murray, 1822.

Proofs of a Conspiracy, reprints and related documents 

 Proofs of a Conspiracy against all the Religions and Governments of Europe, carried on in the Secret Meetings of Free-Masons, Illuminati and Reading Societies, etc., collected from good authorities, Edinburgh, 1797; 2nd ed. London, T. Cadell & W. Davies, 1797 with a Postscript; 3rd ed. with Postscript, Philadelphia, T. Dobson & W. Cobbet, 1798; 4th ed., G. Forman, New York, 1798; Dublin 1798; Proofs of a Conspiracy, Western Islands, 1900; The Illuminati, taken from "Proofs of a world conspiracy", Elizabeth Knauss [1930]; Proof's [sic!] of a Conspiracy, Ram Reprints, 1964; Proofs of a conspiracy, Boston, Western Islands, "The Americanist Classics", [1967]; Proofs of a Conspiracy, Islands Press, 1978; C P a Book Pub, 2002  ; Kessinger Publishing, 2003 ; annotated 5th ed. with foreword by Alex Kurtagic, Proofs of a Conspiracy, The Palingenesis Project (Wermod and Wermod Publishing Group), 2014 ; annotated 6th ed., "Proofs of a Conspiracy," Spradabach Publishing, 2022 .
  Ueber geheime Gesellschaften und deren Gefährlichkeit für Staat und Religion... translated in German, Königslutter, 1800.
 [Anti-Jacobin], New Lights on Jacobinism, abstracted from Professor Robison's History of Free Masonry, with an appendix containing an account of Voltaire's behaviour on his death-bed, and a letter from J. H. Stone to Dr. Priestley, disclosing the principles of Jacobinism. By the author of Jacobinism Displayed, Birmingham, E. Piercy, Birmingham, 1798.
 William Bentley & John Bacon, Extracts from Professor Robison’s "Proofs of a Conspiracy" & c., with Brief Reflections on the Charges he has Exhibited, the Evidence he has Produced and the Merit of his Performance, Boston, Manning & Loring, Boston, 1799.
 Abraham Bishop, Proofs of a Conspiracy, Against Christianity, and the Government of the United States, J. Babcock, 1802.
 Seth Payson, Proofs of the Real Existence, and Dangerous Tendency, of Illuminism, Containing an Abstract of what Dr. Robinson and the Abbé Barruel have Published on this Subject; with Collateral Proofs and General Observations, Charlestown, 1802 [reprinted by Invisible College Press, LLC, 2003]. 
 Henry Dana Ward, Free Masonry. Its Pretensions Exposed in Faithful Extracts of its Standard Authors; with a Review of Town's Speculative Masonry; its Liability to Pervert the Doctrines of Revealed Religion, Discovered in the Spirit of its Doctrines, and in the Application of its Emblems: its Dangerous Tendency Exhibited in Extracts from the Abbé Barruel and Professor Robison, and Further Illustrated in its Base Service to the Illuminati, New York, 1828.

See also 
 Augustin Barruel, author of "Memoirs Illustrating the History of Jacobinism" (1797)
 Lorenzo Hervás, author of "Causes of the French Revolution" (1807)
 Nicholas Bonneville
 Honoré Gabriel Riqueti, comte de Mirabeau

Sources 
 Past anti-Masons : John Robison, on masonicinfo.com
 Biography, Papers of John Robison, Edinburgh University Library
 "The French Revolution and the Bavarian Illuminati", on Robison and Barruel, Freemasonry BC-Y
 "Memoirs of the Life of Dr. Robison," Philosophical Magazine, Vol. X, 1801.
 "Biographical Memoirs of Dr. Robinson, of Edinburgh," Philosophical Magazine, Vol. XIII, 1802.

References

Further reading

External links 

 Complete text of "Proofs of a Conspiracy ..." at sacred-texts.com
 Biography at Significant Scots
 Introduction and first two chapters of Robison's book: "Proofs of a Conspiracy ..."
 Gruber, Hermann (1910). "Illuminati," The Catholic Encyclopedia, Vol. VII. NY: Robert Appleton Company. pp. 661–663.
 Darkness Over All: John Robison and the Birth of the Illuminati Conspiracy

1739 births
1805 deaths
People from East Dunbartonshire
Alumni of the University of Glasgow
Fellows of the Royal Society of Edinburgh
Academics of the University of Edinburgh
Academics of the University of Glasgow
Scottish chemists
Scottish inventors
Scottish physicists
British conspiracy theorists
Anti-Masonry
Royal Navy officers
Scottish sailors
Members of the Philosophical Society of Edinburgh
Enlightenment scientists
Illuminati conspiracy theorists
18th-century Scottish scientists
18th-century British chemists
18th-century British physicists